Miroslav Štefan (born 17 July 1933) is a Czech former sports shooter. He competed at the 1972 Summer Olympics and the 1976 Summer Olympics.

References

1933 births
Living people
Czech male sport shooters
Olympic shooters of Czechoslovakia
Shooters at the 1972 Summer Olympics
Shooters at the 1976 Summer Olympics
Sportspeople from Třinec